Arasakulam is a 2017 Indian Tamil-language action masala film directed by Kumaramaran and starring Rathan Mouli and Nayana Nair.

Cast 
Rathan Mouli as Muthupandi
 Nayana Nair
Rajasimhan
Rajashree
Balamurugan
Ambani Shankar

Production 
The film is based on a true story about a royal family. The film marks the Tamil debut of Malayalam actress Naina Nair and was shot in Kodaikanal, Kovilpatti, Thoothukudi, and Tirunelveli. The film is about friendships between people of southern Tamil Nadu. The director, Kumaramaran, stayed at Theni for two years to observe the people and families there as source material for the script. The audio release function took place in January of 2017.

Release 
A critic from Maalai Malar gave the film a rating of seventy-six out of one-hundred. The reviewer praised the performance of Rathan Mouli, the cinematography, and the songs while criticizing the story citing the lack of one. The Times of India Samyam gave the film a rating of one-and-half out of five stars and criticized the lack of story.

References 

2017 action films
Indian action films
2017 masala films